Ira Jones (July 10, 1923 – July 11, 2004) was an author, best known as the first sergeant in charge of Elvis Presley for a portion of the time Elvis served in the army.

Early life and family

Ira Jones was born in Johnson county, Arkansas the tenth child of Elihu Jones and Bethany Francis McAlister. His siblings; Granville Enos Jones (1905–1977), Sarah Jane (Jones) Townsend (1907–1977), Elmer Jones (1909–1970), Leona (Jones) Pitts (1911–2000), Beulah (Jones) Tumbleson (1913–2004), Columbus Jones (1914–2001), Leonard Jones (1916–1959), Eula (Jones) Owen (1919–2012), Iva (Jones) Rushing (1921–2013), Elihu Jones Jr (1925–2008), Nana Lou (Jones) Hodges (1928–2004), and Wanda Earline (Jones) Page-Davis.

His grandfather Fee Gregory Jones was a Baptist Minister and a son of Robert Jones who was a colporteur who sold publications of the American Tract Society and anti-slavery documents. Robert Jones traveled Kentucky with John Gregg Fee and in January 1858 Jones was beaten by a mob for their anti-slavery stance. Around 1860 Robert Jones along with two other men, Rev. George Candee and Rev. William Kendrick were shaved, tarred and feathered.

Military career

Ira Jones enlisted December 23, 1940. On September 9, 1944, Ira Jones was awarded the Purple Heart for "wounds incurred in action on 27 August 1944" near Paris, France. On May 9, 1945, Ira Jones was awarded The Silver Star Medal for "gallantry in action against the enemy on January 7, 1945." On December 12, 1949, Ira Jones was awarded the Bronze Star Medal for "exemplary conduct in ground combat" while assigned to the 313th Infantry regiment on or about 21 July 1944.

Stationed in Germany with Elvis Presley

In May 1956 Ira Jones was stationed in Bremmerhaven, Friedberg, Germany. Scout Platoon, 1st Medium Tank Battalion, 32nd Armor, of the 3rd Armored Division, part of the U.S. Seventh Army. Ira Jones and Elvis Presley first met in the autumn of 1958 when Elvis was among the replacement troops arriving aboard the USS General Randall.

Elvis drove Jones in a jeep named "HQ 31" for nine months while serving in the Scout Platoon. Although Jones had no idea what Elvis looked like before they met, it has been reported that the two formed a close bond during their time together. 1

On May 6, 1959, Sgt Jones appeared on the popular television game show I've Got A Secret. He was stationed at Fort Benning, Georgia at the time.

Ira Jones retired from the Army in 1963 and in 1978, Jones began writing a book about the time he spent with Elvis, entitled Soldier Boy Elvis. The book was published in 1992. In the years that followed, Jones became a regular speaker at Elvis-related conventions, Bill E. Burk's Elvis World breakfasts and fan club meetings all over the world including in Germany.

Jones appeared in numerous television specials, documentaries and videos including the short-lived newsmagazine Instant Recall, hosted by John Palmer, former news anchor from NBC's The Today Show and the 2001 documentary Remembering Elvis: A Documentary , which also included interviews with comedian Steve Allen and others.

Jones died of a heart attack in July 2004 in the U.S. state of Arkansas where he grew up.

Bibliography
 Soldier Boy Elvis (1993 )

References

External links
Photo of Elvis with Jones
Bill E. Burk pays tribute to Sergeant Ira Jones

1923 births
2004 deaths
United States Army non-commissioned officers
Recipients of the Silver Star
United States Army personnel of World War II
Military personnel from Arkansas
People from Johnson County, Arkansas